Shemel Louison (born August 9, 1990) is a Grenadian footballer who plays as a goalkeeper for Caledonia AIA F.C. in Trinidad and Tobago and the Grenada national team.

Career

International
Louison was called up to the Grenada national team for the 2011 CONCACAF Gold Cup. He started their first game of the tournament, a four-nil loss to Jamaica, and earned positive reviews despite the scoreline.

References

External links
 One-on-one with Shemel Louison

1990 births
Living people
2011 CONCACAF Gold Cup players
Grenadian footballers
Grenada international footballers
TT Pro League players
Morvant Caledonia United players
Place of birth missing (living people)
Grenadian expatriate footballers
Expatriate footballers in Trinidad and Tobago
Grenadian expatriate sportspeople in Trinidad and Tobago
Association football goalkeepers
Fontenoy United FC players
Queens Park Rangers SC players